Celidosphenella vidua is a species of tephritid or fruit flies in the genus Celidosphenella of the family Tephritidae.

Distribution
Chile.

References

Tephritinae
Insects described in 1942
Diptera of South America
Endemic fauna of Chile